Phrissomorimus brunneus is a species of beetle in the family Cerambycidae, and the only species in the genus Phrissomorimus. It was described by Stephan von Breuning and Itzinger in 1943.

References

Phrissomini
Beetles described in 1943